Kyaw Swe (born 1 December 1979) is a Burmese politician who currently serves as a House of Nationalities member of parliament for Magway Region No. 11 constituency. He is a member of the National League for Democracy.

Early life and education 
Kyaw Swe was born in Myaing, Magway Region, Myanmar on 1 December 1960. He graduated with B.A (Myanmar). His former work is School teacher.

Political career
He is a member of the National League for Democracy Party politician. In the 2015 Myanmar general election, he was elected as Amyotha Hluttaw representative from Magway Region No. 11 parliamentary constituency.

References

1960 births
Living people
People from Magway Division
Members of the House of Nationalities
National League for Democracy politicians